Zakroun  is a Maronite village in the Koura District of Lebanon.

As with most of the Koura District, olive tree cultivation and olive oil production is important. The village is also known for its orange trees, the flowers of which are picked in spring to produce orange flower water.

References

External links
Zakroun, Localiban 

Maronite Christian communities in Lebanon
Populated places in the North Governorate
Koura District